Enskede-Årsta was a borough (stadsdelsområde) in the southern part of Stockholm, Sweden from 1998 to 1 January 2007. It was formed when the boroughs of Enskede and Årsta merged, and was primarily made up of Enskede (Gård, -fältet, Gamla-) and Årsta. The other districts that made up the borough were Johanneshov, Stureby and Östberga. The population as of 2004 was 46,072 on an area of 12.72 km2, giving it a density of 3,622/km2. In 2007, Enskede-Årsta merged with the borough of  Vantör to form the Enskede-Årsta-Vantör borough.

Government of Stockholm